RoadRunner is an open-source application server, load-balancer, and process manager written in Golang (Go) and implemented by PHP 7. It is used in rapid application development to speed up the performance of large web applications for users.

History 
Development on RoadRunner began in 2017 by Anton Titov. RoadRunner was initially created to handle the peak loads of a large-scale PHP application developed by Spiral Scout. The end application was experiencing anomaly peaks in very short spurts of time which did not allow classic load balancing mechanisms to activate.

Roadrunner uses multi-threading to keep a PHP application in memory between requests, allowing it to eliminate boot loading and code loading processes and reduce latency. Improved RPC communication between the PHP application and its server processes gives Roadrunner the ability to offload some of the heavy communication from PHP to Go.

Application Features 
 Production-ready PSR-7 compatible HTTP, HTTP2, FastCGI server
 No external PHP dependencies (64bit version required)
 Frontend agnostic (Queue, PSR-7, GRPC, etc.)
 Background job processing (AMQP, Amazon SQS, Beanstalk and memory)
 GRPC server and clients
 Pub/Sub and Websockets broadcasting
 Integrated metrics server (Prometheus)
 Integrations with Symfony, Laravel, Slim, CakePHP, Zend Expressive, Spiral

Licensing 
RoadRunner is a free open-source software under an MIT license. It can be downloaded and installed as a package from the project page or from GitHub.

Versions

References 
New Dedicated Application Server Revs PHP to Peak Performance - DZone Performance
 RoadRunner, the PHP Application Server written in Golang
 Roadrunner & Zend Expressive & Cycle ORM. Not allow to php to die.
 Roadrunner: a PHP application server
 RoadRunner: PHP is not created to die, or Golang to the rescue
 RoadRunner: PHP не создан, чтобы умирать, или Golang спешит на помощь
 spiral/roadrunner - Packagist
 RoadRunner – High-Speed PHP Applications
 Roadrunner – High-performance PHP application server, load-balancer, and process manager written in Golang | PHPnews.io

External links 
 
 PHP to Golang IPC bridge
 GRPC server
 Message queue

Free server software
Go (programming language) software
PHP software